The France men's national basketball team represents France in international basketball and is administered by the French Federation of Basketball. France is currently ranked fifth in the FIBA World Rankings.

France has been a regular at the EuroBasket, qualifying for 39 appearances all-time. Their best finish came in 2013, winning the gold medal. They have also come away with three silver (1949, 2011, 2022) and six bronze medals (1937, 1951, 1953, 1959, 2005, 2015). France has also won two bronze medals at the FIBA World Cup in 2014 and 2019. While at the Summer Olympics, France has won three silver medals (1948, 2000, 2020).

History

Rise and decline (1919–1979)
Throughout its history, France's national basketball team has experienced many ups and downs. The time periods where the national team earned medals have been quite streaky.

In Europe, team France started out as a fierce competitor. The team won five medals at the EuroBasket between 1937 and 1959.
1937: Bronze Medal, 3–2 overall, second in preliminary group, lost semi-final, won bronze medal match
1949: Silver Medal, 5–1 overall, round robin tournament, no playoffs
1951: Bronze Medal; 6–3 overall, second in preliminary group at 3–1, won semi-final group in three-way tie-breaker with 2–1 record, lost semi-final, won bronze medal match
1953: Bronze Medal, 6–4 overall, second in preliminary group at 2–1, second position of four-way tiebreaker for 2nd place in final round with 4–3 record.
1959: Bronze Medal, 6–3 overall, second in preliminary group at 3–1, first in semi-final round at 3–0, third in final round with 1–2 record.

Their period of glory on the world stage began in the late 1940s / early 1950s.
At the 1948 Olympics in London, the France team led by Robert Busnel won an Olympic silver medal, the first Olympic medal in their history. France finished second only to the United States.

In the wake of this Olympic medal, France, led by captain André Vacheresse won three consecutive medals. Including silver at the EuroBasket in 1949, and bronze in 1951 and 1953 respectively.

The following years were less glorious. France's basketball team seemingly declined gradually, to completely fail to medal at major international competitions during the 1960s and 1970s.

Generation of hope (1980–1989)
After the disappointing 60s and 70s, the 1980s were marked by a generation of hope, counting in its ranks French basketball icons such as Richard Dacoury, Stéphane Ostrowski, and Hervé Dubuisson.
During this decade, France returned to the Olympics in 1984, and the World Cup in 1986.

Success and struggle (1990–2000)
During the 1990s France had their moments to shine, despite some internal struggles and many injuries to key players. At the European championship, the team did not win a medal despite some good performances. The years 1999 and 2000, however, marked a turnaround for French basketball. The team built around Antoine Rigaudeau, Tariq Abdul-Wahad, Laurent Sciarra, Jim Bilba, and Laurent Foirest finished in the top 4 at the EuroBasket 1999, which France hosted. Their first loss was in the semi-finals followed by their second loss in the bronze medal match to FR Yugoslavia 74–62, despite some internal problems that disrupted the group of players. In 2000, team France qualified for the 2000 Summer Olympics in Sydney, full of ambition, which developed the means for major achievement. At the end of their stint in Australia, the selection of coach Jean-Pierre de Vincenzi helped lead the team to the silver medal, France's first top 3 performance at a major basketball event in 46 years and their first Olympic medal in 52 years.

Tony Parker joins the team (2001)
After the 2000 Olympics, French phenom Tony Parker was selected by the San Antonio Spurs in the 2001 NBA draft. However, at the EuroBasket 2001, without Antoine Rigaudeau, who surprisingly decided to retire from the national team, the 19-year-old Parker alone was not enough as France failed to repeat their outstanding performance attained at the 2000 Olympic Games. France lost in the quarter-finals to Germany 77–81 and finished in 6th place overall. During this time, most of France's players cleared their spots for a new generation of players, which were available in abundance as the France Junior national team had won the 2000 junior championship.

Setback despite abundance of talent (2003)
At the EuroBasket 2003, France competed with an immensely talented squad, which included NBA players Tony Parker, Jérôme Moïso and Tariq Abdul-Wahad. As well as future pro Boris Diaw, and European standouts Laurent Foirest, Cyril Julian and Florent Piétrus. But despite competing with one of the most promising rosters ever, France lost in the semi-finals against Lithuania, then went on to lose a close battle in the bronze medal match to Italy 67–69.

Restructuring and improved performance (2005)
Hoping not to repeat the disappointing performance of 2003, France's squad once again saw considerable changes heading into EuroBasket 2005. Reconstruction of the national team roster was built based on team chemistry instead of big names; Amongst others, Jérôme Moïso and Tariq Abdul-Wahad disappeared from the roster with the newly formed team being built around the three NBA players Tony Parker, Boris Diaw, and Mickaël Piétrus as well as the returning national team veteran Antoine Rigaudeau. The new coach Claude Bergeaud, surprisingly also selected Frédéric Weis, an underachieving player once drafted in the 1999 NBA draft, who did not participate in the team's preparation. After a sobering preliminary round, France displayed stunning performances in the knockout stage. First, France eliminated Serbia and Montenegro on their home court, then the team defeated the 2003 European champion Lithuania. Heading into their semi-finals match against Greece, where both sides battled each other throughout with tough defense, France collapsed in the final minute after leading by seven points with 45 seconds remaining in regulation. The devastating loss relegated the national team to the bronze medal match once again. However, unlike 2003 France recovered to win the bronze medal by blowing out Spain 98–68.

Continued title aspirations (2006–2010)
At the 2006 FIBA World Cup France competed without Tony Parker, who suffered a twisted finger two days before the competition. Because of this, the San Antonio Spurs, who just signed Parker to a 51 million Euros contract did not allow him to participate. After a preliminary round marked by three wins and two losses, including a shocking defeat at the hands of Lebanon, France beat Angola in the Round of 16 match 68–62 before losing in the quarter-finals against Greece 56–73. Furthermore, two victories in classification matches finally granted the French fifth place.

At the EuroBasket 2007, France fell behind their aspirations again. After a strong preliminary round, the team was eliminated in the quarter-finals by eventual champion Russia 75–71, then was beaten in the classification matches by Croatia 86–69 and Slovenia 88–74, finishing in eighth place, missing out on the Olympic Games for the second consecutive time. In the following months, the team had to go through the ordeal of qualifications to participate in the next EuroBasket which was to be held in 2009. In 2008, former national team coach Michel Gomez returned to lead the team, a position he held between 1993 and 1995. But Gomez failed to help France qualify directly for the European Championship, and had to enter a repechage tournament. In August 2009 he was replaced by Vincent Collet, coach of ASVEL Lyon-Villeurbanne.

Under Collet's direction, Les Bleus grabbed the last ticket to the EuroBasket 2009 by trashing Belgium 92–54 in the final game of the repechage. At the European Championship, France won their first six games of the first two rounds but failed in the quarter-finals against the eventual tournament champion Spain. The French ultimately finished in fifth place, a performance which would grant the team the direct qualification for the next two major competitions, the 2010 FIBA World Cup and EuroBasket 2011.

Rise to the world elite (2011–present)

After a disappointing showing from France during the 2010 FIBA World Cup, where they were knocked out in the Round of 16, the team looked toward EuroBasket 2011 with high expectations after an impressive run in 2009. France was placed into Group B, with Latvia as their first opponent. France got off to a slow start to begin the game as they trailed after the first quarter 18–25. Although the team would step it up in the second quarter, to only trail 40–41 at halftime. In the second half, France demonstrated why they were one of the favourites heading into the tournament. As they finished off the game strong and pulled out the win 89–78, behind Tony Parker's game high (31 points and 7 assists). In their second match against Israel, France never faced any pressure, as they led throughout to an 68–85 victory. Standing with a record of (2–0), next up for France was a date with Dirk Nowitzki and Germany. Similar to their first match, France got off to another slow start where the team trailed after the first period. But they rallied back in the second quarter to take a 29–28 halftime lead. France exploded in the third quarter, which gave the national team an 18 point cushion heading into the fourth quarter. This deficit would prove too much to overcome for Germany, as France led by Tony Parker's 32 points on 55% shooting, and six assists moved to (3–0).

Still undefeated, France had another tough test awaiting, with Italy in their way. For three quarters France struggled against the stymie defense of the Italians, where they were down 67–60 heading into the fourth quarter. With Tony Parker having an off shooting night, other team leaders such as Boris Diaw (21 points), and Nicolas Batum (20 points) gave the team the lift it needed down the stretch to prevail 84–91. The win also helped France clinch a spot in the second group phase. France having already locked up a spot to advance went up against the undefeated Serbia in their final match of Group B. In a highly competitive match between these two unbeaten teams, where overtime was needed to determine the winner; France with balanced scoring from six players in double figures handed Serbia their first lost 96–97.

In the second group phase France won their first two matches against Turkey, and Lithuania, before falling to Spain. The result was enough to book a place into the quarter-finals. There, France battled Greece with a chance to reach the semis on the line. The team eventually escaped with a 64–56 victory. France needing one more win to put themselves in position to play for the title, first had to get past Andrei Kirilenko and Russia. The two teams played a really close game throughout, but France did just enough to place themselves in prime position to move on.

France reached the final of the EuroBasket for the first time since 1949, where they were up against Spain. Unfortunately, the team came up short, as Spain repeated as European champions. However, led by the extraordinary performances from the iconic Tony Parker, France proved they would be a threat on the international scene in the future.

The 2012 Summer Olympics came and went without much noise made from the French, as the team bowed out in the quarter-finals. Heading toward the EuroBasket 2013, France was eager to flip the script and display the execution needed to make a deep tournament run. However, in their first match at the Euro finals in Group A, France was defeated by Germany 74–80. The loss quickly refocused the team for their next two matches, against Great Britain, and Israel, as they blew out both opponents fairly easily. France went on to also win their next two games in the preliminary phase against Ukraine and Belgium, to finish top of Group A to advance.

During the second group phase France suffered their second loss of the tournament, falling to Lithuania. Although the team turned around in their next match to beat Latvia 102–91, behind big games from center Alexis Ajinça (25 points and 3 blocks) and Tony Parker's (23 points). With a place in the quarter-finals assured, France managed to drop their third match, this time a 77–65 defeat to Serbia.

In their quarter-finals match France were up against the EuroBasket 2013 host Slovenia. However, the team dispelled any notion there would be carryover from their prior game, as they prevailed 62–72. The win also setup a EuroBasket 2011 final rematch between Spain. Heading into the semi-finals, France was resolute to make amends for their 2009 and 2011 eliminations. But it was the Spaniards who began this duel with more urgency, as they outplayed the French in the first half to lead 34–20. To begin the third quarter France slowly started cutting into Spain's lead with their defensive tenacity to trail 49–43 going into the fourth quarter. Entering the final period France continued their harassing defensive pressure, which started to wear the Spaniards down. France eventually fought all the way back, to pull even with their nemesis 65–65 to send the game into overtime. In extra time, France did not let this golden opportunity slip away, as they finally pulled ahead to win 72–75. Led once again by Tony Parker and his (32 points), along with the clutch performance from Antoine Diot, France were heading back to the title game.

Ensuing their emotional win against Spain, France entered the final against Lithuania ready to seize the moment and create history. France, after years of coming up short in these situations finally became European champions. Additionally, the stellar play from Tony Parker throughout the tournament earned himself MVP honors.

Due to their rousing accomplishment at EuroBasket 2013, France qualified for the 2014 FIBA World Cup. Although without the services of Tony Parker, other players stepped up to try and fill the void. France was drawn into Group A at the finals, which many viewed as the Group of Death. Their first opponent was Brazil, which resulted in a tightly contested match the French would lose 63–65. Next up for France, was a date with Serbia. France looking to pick up their first win during the finals, battled back and forth with the Serbians until they escaped with a narrow 73–74 victory. Now at a record of (1–1), France easily put away Egypt in their third match of the group stage before they faced the tournament hosts Spain. There, the team was thoroughly outplayed by the Spanish, who handed France a heavy defeat 88–64. Although the French would rebound to close out the preliminary phase with a win against Iran 81–76.

Entering the Round of 16, waiting for France was Croatia. The French would get off to a lethargic start, as they trailed the Croatians 7–15 after the first quarter. France would ultimately reverse their fortune in the second, turning up their defense to hold Croatia to just seven points to head into halftime with a one-point lead. Entering the third quarter, France continued to frustrate Croatia on defense, to extend their advantage heading to the fourth. However, Croatia would put up a solid final period to no avail, France would hold on 69–64 to advance. In the quarter-finals, France would once again be paired against a familiar foe, Spain. Although this time around France displayed more resolve against the Spaniards, as they eliminated one of the World Cup favourites comfortably 65–52.

France arrived at the semi-finals confident before their rematch with Serbia. But even after a remarkable 35-point performance from Nicolas Batum, France lost to the eventual tournament runners-up 85–90. After the devastating lost in the semis, France turned around and finished up strong to win a highly competitive bronze medal match against Lithuania 93–95.

France was named as one of four co-hosts for EuroBasket 2015. At the Euro finals, France was aided by the return of EuroBasket 2013 MVP Tony Parker to the national team. With their floor general back in the fold, the French were tabbed as one of the early favourites to win the tournament and repeat. Being placed into Group A to begin their title defense, France was tasked with Finland as their first opponent. In front of an exuberant home crowd, France got off to a quick start to possess the lead after the first quarter. The French would continue to feed off this momentum as they extended their advantage heading into halftime up 45–37. Although in the third and fourth quarters Finland mounted a vigorous comeback, to send the match into overtime. However, France would not be denied on their home soil, as they pulled out an emotional 97–87 victory. After the win, France would go on to triumph through their remaining four matches in group play to clinch a place into the Round of 16.

Awaiting France in their next match was Turkey, a game they would cruise to victory 76–53. Their opponent in the quarter-finals was Latvia, who were looking to upset the hosts and advance to the semis. They were ultimately denied that chance 84–70, as France in front of over 22,000 spectators at Stade Pierre-Mauroy moved closer to their desired destination. France, needing one more win to put themselves in position to play in the final, were again pitted against rivals Spain. In a classic duel between the two battle-tested sides, it was the Spaniards led by Pau Gasol's 40 points and 11 rebounds ending France's hope of repeating. However, with third place still on the line France defeated Serbia 81–68 to come away with the bronze medal.After going (4–0) during the 2016 Olympic Qualifying Tournament, France qualified for the 2016 Summer Olympics. Although they only managed to reach the quarter-finals before ceding once again to Spain. After the tournament, French great Tony Parker announced his retirement from the national team, ending an illustrious run with Les Bleurs''.

At EuroBasket 2017, France continued their underwhelming play, as the team was knocked out in the Round of 16 to Germany 84–81. The devastating loss for France was their worst finish at the Euros since 1963.

During the process to qualify for the 2019 FIBA World Cup, France went through European Qualifiers in order to secure a spot. The national team would go on to finish with a (10–2) record during qualifying to clinch their place at the World Cup finals.

At the 2019 FIBA World Cup, France entered the tournament looking to continue their strong play the team displayed during the qualifiers. France was slotted into Group G to begin their run at the World Cup finals. Their first test was against a familiar foe in Germany, a match that went down to the wire. But behind the heroics of national team star Evan Fournier's (26 points and 10 rebounds) France pulled out a tight 78–74 win. In their final two preliminary group phase matches versus Jordan and Dominican Republic, France advanced to the second group phase, by trashing their opponents on route to heavy victories.

In France's next encounter, the team were up against Lithuania. France, however, prevailed in a physical clash between the two European heavyweights 78–75, to lockup a spot into the quarter-finals with one match remaining in the second group phase. There, France were pitted against Australia. Although even with another strong showing from Evan Fournier, and his (31 points and 6 rebounds) the team fell 98–100.

In the quarter-finals, France had the duty of trying to knock off the favourites of the tournament, the United States. Ultimately led by majestic games from Evan Fournier and big man Rudy Gobert, France eliminated the United States 79–89. The win advanced the team into the semi-finals with a date versus Argentina. With the emotional confidence boosting win behind them, France exhibited lackluster urgency in their next match in an 80–66 defeat to the Argentines. The lost for France was their second consecutive ouster in the semis at the World Cup. France would move on to claim the bronze medal, downing Australia in a rematch 67–59.

Heading toward the 2020 Summer Olympics, France automatically qualified for the event, through being one of top two European finishers at the prior World Cup. In the opening match of the tournament for France, behind Evan Fournier's team high (28 points), France once again defeated the United States 83–76. After the solid victory, France would make it all the way to the semi-finals to meet the surprise team of the competition to that point, in Luka Dončić and Slovenia. With a place into the gold medal game on the line, Nicolas Batum's game saving block at the buzzer lifted France into the final 90–89. Although in a rematch with the United States, France would have to settle for silver, as the team would lose 82–87.

During EuroBasket 2022 qualifying, France made it through with a (4–2) record, to clinch qualification to their 39th appearance to the Euro finals. After losing in their first match of Group B to Germany, France moved to (1–1), following a strong victory against rivals Lithuania 73–77. France would go on to win two of their last three group stage matches, to advance into the knockout phase. In the Round of 16, France survived an upset scare in overtime, from a feisty Turkish side 86–87. Entering the quarter-finals, France once again needed overtime to keep their title hopes alive, this time in a win against Italy 93–85. After cruising passed Poland in the semi-finals, France were back in the final of the EuroBasket for first time since 2013. However, the team saw its tournament journey end, falling to Spain 88–76.

Competitive record

FIBA World Cup

Olympic Games

EuroBasket

Results and fixtures

2021

2022

2023

Team

Current roster
Roster for the 2023 FIBA World Cup Qualifiers matches on 23 and 26 February 2023 against Czech Republic and Lithuania.

Depth chart

Head coach history

Past rosters
1935 EuroBasket: finished 5th among 10 teams

3 Pierre Boël, 4 Robert Cohu, 5 Jacques Flouret, 6 Raoul Gouga, 7 Henri Hell, 8 Charles Hemmerlin, 9 Étienne Rolland, 10 Francis Rudler (Coach: Teddy Kriegk)

1936 Olympic Games: finished 19th among 21 teams

1 Pierre Boël, 2 Pierre Caque, 3 Georges Carrier, 4 Robert Cohu, 5 Jean Couturier, 6 Jacques Flouret, 7 Edmond Leclerc, 8 Étienne Onimus, 9 Fernand Prudhomme, 10 Étienne Rolland, 11 Lucien Thèze (Coach: Teddy Kriegk)

1937 EuroBasket: finished 3rd  among 8 teams

3 Pierre Boël, 4 Robert Cohu, 5 Jacques Flouret, 6 Henri Hell, 7 Edmond Leclerc, 8 Henri Lesmayoux, 9 Fernand Prudhomme, 10 Étienne Rolland, 11 Eugene Ronner, 12 Marcel Verot (Coach: Henri Kretzschmar)

1939 EuroBasket: finished 4th among 8 teams

3 Vladimir Fabrikant, 4 Henri Lesmayoux, 5 Fernand Prudhomme, 6 Jean Jeammes, 7 Étienne Rolland, 8 Émile Frézot, 9 Alexandre Katlama, 10 Robert Cohu, 11 Maurice Mertz, 12 Abel Gravier, 13 Robert Busnel, 14 André Ambroise, 15 Gabriel Gonnet, 16 Gaston Falleur (Coach: Paul Geist)

1946 EuroBasket: finished 4th among 10 teams

3 André Buffière, 4 Jean Duperray, 5 Robert Busnel, 6 Jacques Perrier, 7 Andre Tartary, 8 Justy Specker, 9 Lucien Rebuffic, 10 Paul Chaumont, 11 Henri Lesmayoux, 12 Émile Frézot, 13 Étienne Rolland, 14 René Chocat, 15 André Goeuriot, 16 Maurice Girardot (Coach: Paul Geist)

1947 EuroBasket: finished 5th among 14 teams

3 André Goeuriot, 4 Jean Duperray, 5 Robert Busnel, 6 Émile Frézot, 7 Pierre Thiolon, 8 Jacques Perrier, 9 René Chocat, 10 Fernand Guillou, 11 Jacques Favory, 12 Marcel Béziers, 13 Aimé Gravas, 14 Maurice Girardot, 15 Henri Lesmayoux, 16 Jacques Faucherre (Coach: Michael Rutzgis)

1948 Olympic Games: finished 2nd  among 23 teams

3 André Buffière, 4 René Dérency, 5 Pierre Thiolon, 6 Jacques Perrier, 7 René Chocat, 8 Raymond Offner, 9 André Even, 10 Maurice Desaymonnet, 11 Fernand Guillou, 12 Michel Bonnevie, 13 Maurice Girardot, 14 Lucien Rebuffic, 15 Yvan Quénin, 16 André Barrais (Coach: Robert Busnel)

1949 EuroBasket: finished 2nd  among 7 teams

3 André Buffière, 4 Jean Perniceni, 5 Jacques Freimuller, 6 Jean Swidzinski, 7 René Chocat, 8 Jean-Pierre Salignon, 9 Marc Quiblier, 10 Robert Busnel, 11 Jacques Dessemme, 12 André Vacheresse, 13 Louis Devoti, 14 Maurice Desaymonnet, 15 Jacques Favory, 16 Fernand Guillou (Coach: Robert Busnel)

1950 FIBA World Cup: finished 6th among 10 teams

3 Jacques Perrier, 4 Jean Swidzinski, 5 Jean Perniceni, 6 Fernand Guillou, 7 Robert Marsolat, 8 Jean-Pierre Salignon, 9 Maurice Marcelot, 10 Maurice Desaymonnet, 11 Jacques Dessemme, 12 André Vacheresse, 13 Jacques Chalifour, 15 Robert Monclar (Coach: Robert Busnel)

1951 EuroBasket: finished 3rd  among 17 teams

3 André Vacheresse, 4 Pierre Thiolon, 5 Marc Quiblier, 6 Louis Devoti, 7 Jacques Freimuller, 8 Jean-Pierre Salignon, 9 Justy Specker, 10 René Chocat, 11 Jacques Dessemme, 12 André Buffière, 13 Robert Guillin, 14 Marc Peirone, 15 Robert Monclar, 16 Jean Perniceni (Coach: Robert Busnel)

1952 Olympic Games: finished 8th among 23 teams

3 Roger Haudegand, 4 Bernard Planque, 5 Robert Monclar, 6 René Chocat, 7 Jean Perniceni, 8 Louis Devoti, 9 Robert Guillin, 10 Robert Crost, 11 Jacques Dessemme, 12 André Buffière, 13 André Vacheresse, 14 André Chavet, 15 Jean-Pierre Salignon, 16 Jean-Paul Beugnot (Coach: Robert Busnel)

1953 EuroBasket: finished 3rd  among 17 teams

3 Jacques Freimuller, 4 Bernard Planque, 5 Robert Monclar, 6 Claude Gallay, 7 Jean Perniceni, 8 Roger Haudegand, 9 Robert Guillin, 10 René Chocat, 11 Jacques Dessemme, 12 André Buffière, 13 André Vacheresse, 14 Henri Rey, 15 Marc Quiblier, 16 Justy Specker (Coach: Robert Busnel)

1954 FIBA World Cup: finished 4th among 12 teams

3 Roger Haudegand, 4 Robert Zagury, 5 Robert Monclar, 6 Jacques Freimuller, 7 Jean Perniceni, 8 Henri Rey, 9 Roger Antoine, 10 Henri Grange, 11 Jacques Dessemme, 12 André Buffière, 13 Louis Bertorelle, 14 Jean-Paul Beugnot, 15 André Schlupp, 16 Yves Gominon (Coach: Robert Busnel)

1955 EuroBasket: finished 9th among 18 teams

3 Gérard Pontais, 4 Bernard Planque, 5 Robert Monclar, 6 Jacques Freimuller, 7 Jean Perniceni, 8 Henri Rey, 9 Jacques Owen, 10 Henri Grange, 11 Maurice Marcelot, 12 André Buffière, 13 André Vacheresse, 14 Jean-Paul Beugnot, 15 Louis Bertorelle, 16 Robert Giraud (Coach: Robert Busnel)

1956 Olympic Games: finished 4th among 15 teams

3 Roger Haudegand, 4 Christian Baltzer, 5 Robert Monclar, 6 Roger Veyron, 7 Gérard Sturla, 8 Henri Rey, 9 Roger Antoine, 10 Henri Grange, 11 Yves Gominon, 12 Maurice Buffière, 13 André Schlupp, 14 Jean-Paul Beugnot (Coach: Robert Busnel)

1957 EuroBasket: finished 8th among 16 teams

3 Louis Bertorelle, 4 Christian Baltzer, 5 Robert Monclar, 6 Maurice Buffière, 7 Gérard Sturla, 8 Roger Guillaume, 9 Roger Antoine, 10 Henri Grange, 11 Bernard Mayeur, 12 Roger Veyron, 13 Claude Desseaux, 14 Jean-Claude Lefebvre (Coach: André Buffière)

1959 EuroBasket: finished 3rd  among 17 teams

3 Max Dorigo, 4 André Chavet, 5 Robert Monclar, 6 Christian Baltzer, 7 Lucien Sedat, 8 Henri Villecourt, 9 Jérôme Christ, 10 Henri Grange, 11 Bernard Mayeur, 12 Michel Rat, 13 Philippe Baillet, 14 Jean-Claude Lefebvre (Coach: André Buffière)

1960 Olympic Games: finished 10th among 16 teams

3 Henri Villecourt, 4 Max Dorigo, 5 Robert Monclar, 6 Jérôme Christ, 7 Jean Degros, 8 Christian Baltzer, 9 Roger Antoine, 10 Henri Grange, 11 Bernard Mayeur, 12 Jean-Paul Beugnot, 13 Philippe Baillet, 14 Louis Bertorelle (Coach: André Buffière)

1961 EuroBasket: finished 4th among 19 teams

4 Lucien Sedat, 5 Jean-Pierre Goisbault, 6 Jérôme Christ, 7 Michel Housse, 9 Michel Le Ray, 10 Henri Grange, 11 Bernard Mayeur, 12 Jean-Paul Beugnot, 13 Christian Baltzer, 14 André Souvré, 15 Jean-Claude Vergne, 16 Michel Rat (Coach: André Buffière)

1963 FIBA World Cup: finished 5th among 13 teams

4 Max Dorigo, 5 Jean-Daniel Vinson, 6 Alain Gilles, 7 Jean Degros, 8 Christian Baltzer, 9 Michel Le Ray, 10 Henri Grange, 11 Bernard Mayeur, 12 Jean-Baptiste Ré, 13 Michel Rat, 14 Raphaël Ruiz, 15 Jean-Claude Lefebvre (Coach: André Buffière)

1963 EuroBasket: finished 13th among 16 teams

4 Michel Rat, 5 Claude Marc, 6 Jean-Claude Bonato, 7 Jean Degros, 8 Christian Baltzer, 9 Jacques Caballé, 10 Jean-Pierre Goisbault, 11 Alain Gilles, 12 Jean-Baptiste Ré, 13 Michel Audureau, 14 Philippe Baillet, 15 Jean-Claude Lefebvre (Coach: André Buffière)

1965 EuroBasket: finished 9th among 16 teams

4 Gérard Capron, 5 Laurent Dorigo, 6 Alain Gilles, 7 Jean Degros, 8 Hubert Papin, 9 Michel Le Ray, 10 Ferruccio Biasucci, 11 Daniel Ledent, 12 Jean-Marie Jouaret, 13 Maurice Boulois, 14 Jean-Claude Bonato, 15 Alain Schol (Coach: Joë Jaunay)

1967 EuroBasket: finished 11th among 16 teams

4 Francis Schneider, 5 Charles Tassin, 6 Alain Gilles, 7 Jean Degros, 8 Alain Schol, 9 Michel Le Ray, 10 Jean-Claude Bonato, 11 Jean-Pierre Staelens, 12 Michel Longueville, 13 Gérard Lespinasse, 14 Claude Peter, 15 Alain Durand (Coach: Joë Jaunay)

1971 EuroBasket: finished 10th among 12 teams

4 Daniel Ledent, 5 Charles Tassin, 6 Alain Gilles, 7 Carlo Wilm, 8 Claude Gasnal, 9 Bernard Magnin, 10 Jean-Claude Bonato, 11 Jean-Pierre Staelens, 12 Michel Longueville, 13 Gérard Lespinasse, 14 Jacques Cachemire, 15 Alain Durand (Coach: Joë Jaunay)

1973 EuroBasket: finished 10th among 12 teams

4 Pierre Galle, 5 Daniel Ledent, 6 Jean-Michel Sénégal, 7 Charles Tassin, 8 Yves-Marie Vérove, 9 Jean-Louis Vacher, 10 Jean-Claude Bonato, 11 Firmin Onissah, 12 Claude Gasnal, 13 Jacques Cachemire, 14 Jacky Lamothe, 15 Patrick Demars (Coach: Joë Jaunay)

1977 EuroBasket: finished 11th among 12 teams

4 Barry White, 5 Jean-Louis Vacher, 6 Alain Gilles, 7 Alain Larrouquis, 8 Alain Durand, 9 Didier Dobbels, 10 Mathieu Bisséni, 11 Hervé Dubuisson, 12 Jacky Lamothe, 13 Jacques Cachemire, 14 Éric Beugnot, 15 Roger Duquesnoy (Coach: Pierre Dao)

1979 EuroBasket: finished 8th among 12 teams

4 Victor Boistol, 5 Jean-Michel Sénégal, 6 Saint-Ange Vebobe, 7 Jacques Monclar, 8 Bill Cain, 9 George Brosterhous, 10 Mathieu Bisséni, 11 Hervé Dubuisson, 12 Jacky Lamothe, 13 Jacques Cachemire, 14 Éric Beugnot, 15 Apollo Faye (Coach: Pierre Dao)

1981 EuroBasket: finished 8th among 12 teams

4 Patrick Cham, 5 Jean-Michel Sénégal, 6 Frédéric Hufnagel, 7 Jacques Monclar, 8 Philippe Szanyiel, 9 Didier Dobbels, 10 Richard Dacoury, 11 Hervé Dubuisson, 12 Jacky Lamothe, 13 Jacques Cachemire, 14 Éric Beugnot, 15 Jean-Luc Deganis (Coach: Pierre Dao)

1983 EuroBasket: finished 5th among 12 teams

4 Alain Larrouquis, 5 Jean-Michel Sénégal, 6 Richard Dacoury, 7 Jacques Monclar, 8 Philippe Szanyiel, 9 George Brosterhous, 10 Apollo Faye, 11 Hervé Dubuisson, 12 Daniel Haquet, 13 Jacques Cachemire, 14 Éric Beugnot, 15 Georges Vestris (Coach: Pierre Dao)

1984 Olympic Games: finished 11th among 12 teams

4 Grégor Beugnot, 5 Jean-Michel Sénégal, 6 Richard Dacoury, 7 Jacques Monclar, 8 Philippe Szanyiel, 9 Stéphane Ostrowski, 10 Jean-Luc Deganis, 11 Hervé Dubuisson, 12 Patrick Cham, 13 Bangaly Kaba, 14 Éric Beugnot, 15 Georges Vestris (Coach: Jean Luent)

1985 EuroBasket: finished 6th among 12 teams

4 Frédéric Hufnagel, 5 Franck Cazalon, 6 Patrick Cham, 7 Jacques Monclar, 8 Philippe Szanyiel, 9 Stéphane Ostrowski, 10 Christophe Grégoire, 11 Hervé Dubuisson, 12 Daniel Haquet, 13 Christian Garnier, 14 Jean-Louis Hersin, 15 Valéry Demory (Coach: Jean Luent)

1986 FIBA World Cup: finished 13th among 24 teams

4 Frédéric Hufnagel, 5 Valéry Demory, 6 Patrick Cham, 7 Jacques Monclar, 8 Richard Dacoury, 9 Stéphane Ostrowski, 10 Christian Garnier, 11 Hervé Dubuisson, 12 Daniel Haquet, 13 Jean-Luc Deganis, 14 Éric Beugnot, 15 Georges Vestris (Coach: Jean Galle)

1987 EuroBasket: finished 9th among 12 teams

4 Frédéric Hufnagel, 5 Valéry Demory, 6 Patrick Cham, 7 Richard Dacoury, 8 Frédéric Monetti, 9 Stéphane Ostrowski, 10 Pierre Bressant, 11 Hervé Dubuisson, 12 Jean-Louis Hersin, 13 Jean-Luc Deganis, 14 Éric Beugnot, 15 Georges Vestris (Coach: Jean Galle)

1989 EuroBasket: finished 6th among 8 teams

4 Frédéric Forte, 5 Jim Bilba, 6 Grégor Beugnot, 7 Richard Dacoury, 8 Stéphane Lauvergne, 9 Stéphane Ostrowski, 10 Éric Occansey, 11 Hervé Dubuisson, 12 Patrick Cham, 13 Skeeter Jackson, 14 Franck Butter, 15 Georges Vestris (Coach: Francis Jordane)

1991 EuroBasket: finished 4th among 8 teams

4 Frédéric Forte, 5 Valéry Demory, 6 Antoine Rigaudeau, 7 Richard Dacoury, 8 Philippe Szanyiel, 9 Stéphane Ostrowski, 10 Hugues Occansey, 11 Didier Gadou, 12 Félix Courtinard, 13 Georges Adams, 14 Jim Deines, 15 Jim Bilba (Coach: Francis Jordane)

1993 EuroBasket: finished 7th among 16 teams

4 Frédéric Forte, 5 Olivier Allinéi, 6 Christophe Soulé, 7 Stéphane Risacher, 8 Yann Bonato, 9 Stéphane Ostrowski, 10 Bruno Coqueran, 11 Antoine Rigaudeau, 12 Félix Courtinard, 13 Georges Adams, 14 Thierry Gadou, 15 Jim Bilba (Coach: Francis Jordane)

1995 EuroBasket: finished 8th among 14 teams

4 Frédéric Forte, 5 Moustapha Sonko, 6 Antoine Rigaudeau, 7 Bruno Hamm, 8 Yann Bonato, 9 Stéphane Ostrowski, 10 Hugues Occansey, 11 Thierry Gadou, 12 Didier Gadou, 13 Franck Butter, 14 Jim Bilba, 15 Frédéric Domon (Coach: Michel Gomez)

1997 EuroBasket: finished 10th among 16 teams

4 Laurent Pluvy, 5 Jérôme Moïso, 6 Fabien Dubos, 7 Laurent Foirest, 8 Yann Bonato, 9 Frédéric Fauthoux, 10 Stéphane Risacher, 11 Thierry Gadou, 12 Cyril Julian, 13 Georges Adams, 14 Laurent Sciarra, 15 Rémi Rippert (Coach: Jean-Pierre de Vincenzi)

1999 EuroBasket: finished 4th among 16 teams

4 Moustapha Sonko, 5 Alain Digbeu, 6 Antoine Rigaudeau, 7 Laurent Foirest, 8 Laurent Sciarra, 9 Tariq Abdul-Wahad, 10 Stéphane Risacher, 11 Thierry Gadou, 12 Cyril Julian, 13 Frédéric Weis, 14 Jim Bilba, 15 Ronnie Smith (Coach: Jean-Pierre de Vincenzi)

2000 Olympic Games: finished 2nd  among 12 teams

4 Moustapha Sonko, 5 Laurent Sciarra, 6 Antoine Rigaudeau, 7 Laurent Foirest, 8 Yann Bonato, 9 Makan Dioumassi, 10 Stéphane Risacher, 11 Thierry Gadou, 12 Cyril Julian, 13 Crawford Palmer, 14 Jim Bilba, 15 Frédéric Weis (Coach: Jean-Pierre de Vincenzi)

2001 EuroBasket: finished 6th among 16 teams

4 Éric Micoud, 5 Laurent Sciarra, 6 Tony Parker, 7 Laurent Foirest, 8 Alain Digbeu, 9 Makan Dioumassi, 10 Stéphane Risacher, 11 Vassil Evtimov, 12 Cyril Julian, 13 Crawford Palmer, 14 Jim Bilba, 15 Frédéric Weis (Coach: Alain Weisz)

2003 EuroBasket: finished 4th among 16 teams

4 Moustapha Sonko, 5 Tariq Abdul-Wahad, 6 Jérôme Moïso, 7 Laurent Foirest, 8 Alain Digbeu, 9 Tony Parker, 10 Makan Dioumassi, 11 Florent Piétrus, 12 Cyril Julian, 13 Boris Diaw, 14 Thierry Rupert, 15 Ronny Turiaf (Coach: Alain Weisz)

2005 EuroBasket: finished 3rd  among 16 teams

4 Frédéric Fauthoux, 5 Mickaël Gelabale, 6 Antoine Rigaudeau, 7 Cyril Julian, 8 Mickaël Piétrus, 9 Tony Parker, 10 Mamoutou Diarra, 11 Florent Piétrus, 12 Jérôme Schmitt, 13 Boris Diaw, 14 Frédéric Weis, 15 Sacha Giffa (Coach: Claude Bergeaud)

2006 FIBA World Cup: finished 5th among 24 teams

4 Joseph Gomis, 5 Mickaël Gelabale, 6 Aymeric Jeanneau, 7 Laurent Foirest, 8 Mickaël Piétrus, 9 Mamoutou Diarra, 10 Yannick Bokolo, 11 Florent Piétrus, 12 Johan Petro, 13 Boris Diaw, 14 Ronny Turiaf, 15 Frédéric Weis (Coach: Claude Bergeaud)

2007 EuroBasket: finished 8th among 16 teams

4 Joseph Gomis, 5 Pape Badiane, 6 Sacha Giffa, 7 Yohann Sangaré, 8 Yakhouba Diawara, 9 Tony Parker, 10 Cédric Ferchaud, 11 Florent Piétrus, 12 Tariq Kirksay, 13 Boris Diaw, 14 Ronny Turiaf, 15 Frédéric Weis (Coach: Claude Bergeaud)

2009 EuroBasket: finished 5th among 16 teams

4 Antoine Diot, 5 Nicolas Batum, 6 Aymeric Jeanneau, 7 Alain Koffi, 8 Ian Mahinmi, 9 Tony Parker, 10 Yannick Bokolo, 11 Florent Piétrus, 12 Nando de Colo, 13 Boris Diaw, 14 Ronny Turiaf, 15 Ali Traoré (Coach: Vincent Collet)

2010 FIBA World Cup: finished 13th among 24 teams

4 Andrew Albicy, 5 Nicolas Batum, 6 Fabien Causeur, 7 Alain Koffi, 8 Ian Mahinmi, 9 Edwin Jackson, 10 Yannick Bokolo, 11 Florent Piétrus, 12 Nando de Colo, 13 Boris Diaw, 14 Mickaël Gelabale, 15 Ali Traoré (Coach: Vincent Collet)

2011 EuroBasket: finished 2nd  among 24 teams

4 Joakim Noah, 5 Nicolas Batum, 6 Kevin Séraphin, 7 Andrew Albicy, 8 Charles Lombahe-Kahudi, 9 Tony Parker, 10 Ali Traoré, 11 Florent Piétrus, 12 Nando de Colo, 13 Boris Diaw (C), 14 Steed Tchicamboud, 15 Mickaël Gelabale (Coach: Vincent Collet)

2012 Olympic Games: finished 6th among 12 teams

4 Kevin Seraphin, 5 Nicolas Batum, 6 Fabien Causeur, 7 Yakhouba Diawara, 8 Ali Traore, 9 Tony Parker, 10 Yannick Bokolo, 11 Florent Piétrus, 12 Nando de Colo, 13 Boris Diaw (C), 14 Ronny Turiaf, 15 Mickaël Gelabale (Coach: Vincent Collet)

2013 EuroBasket: finished 1st  among 24 teams

4 Joffrey Lauvergne, 5 Nicolas Batum, 6 Antoine Diot, 7 Johan Petro, 8 Charles Lombahe-Kahudi, 9 Tony Parker (MVP), 10 Thomas Heurtel, 11 Florent Piétrus, 12 Nando de Colo, 13 Boris Diaw (C), 14 Alexis Ajinça, 15 Mickaël Gelabale (Coach: Vincent Collet)

2014 FIBA World Cup: finished 3rd  among 24 teams

4 Thomas Heurtel, 5 Nicolas Batum, 6 Antoine Diot, 7 Joffrey Lauvergne, 8 Charles Lombahe-Kahudi, 9 Edwin Jackson, 10 Evan Fournier, 11 Florent Piétrus, 12 Rudy Gobert, 13 Boris Diaw (C), 14 Kim Tillie, 15 Mickaël Gelabale (Coach: Vincent Collet)

2015 EuroBasket: finished 3rd  among 24 teams

4 Léo Westermann, 5 Nicolas Batum, 7 Joffrey Lauvergne, 8 Charles Lombahe-Kahudi, 9 Tony Parker, 10 Evan Fournier, 11 Florent Piétrus, 12 Nando de Colo, 13 Boris Diaw (C), 15 Mickaël Gelabale, 16 Rudy Gobert, 19 Mouhammadou Jaiteh (Coach: Vincent Collet)    

2016 Olympic Games: finished 6th among 12 teams

4 Thomas Heurtel, 5 Nicolas Batum, 6 Antoine Diot, 7 Joffrey Lauvergne, 8 Charles Lombahe-Kahudi, 9 Tony Parker, 11 Florent Piétrus, 12 Nando de Colo, 13 Boris Diaw (C), 15 Mickaël Gelabale, 16 Rudy Gobert, 17 Kim Tillie (Coach: Vincent Collet)

2017 EuroBasket: finished 12th among 24 teams

1 Kevin Séraphin, 4 Thomas Heurtel, 6 Antoine Diot, 7 Joffrey Lauvergne, 10 Evan Fournier, 12 Nando de Colo, 13 Boris Diaw (C),15 Léo Westermann, 17 Vincent Poirier, 25 Louis Labeyrie, 33 Axel Toupane, 91 Edwin Jackson (Coach: Vincent Collet)

2019 FIBA World Cup: finished 3rd  among 32 teams

1 Frank Ntilikina, 2 Amath M'Baye, 5 Nicolas Batum (C), 10 Evan Fournier, 12 Nando de Colo, 17 Vincent Poirier, 21 Andrew Albicy,25 Louis Labeyrie, 26 Mathias Lessort, 27 Rudy Gobert, 33 Axel Toupane, 90 Paul Lacombe (Coach: Vincent Collet)

2020 Olympic Games: finished 2nd  among 12 teams

1 Frank Ntilikina, 3 Timothé Luwawu-Cabarrot, 4 Thomas Heurtel, 5 Nicolas Batum (C), 7 Guerschon Yabusele, 10 Evan Fournier,12 Nando de Colo, 17 Vincent Poirier, 21 Andrew Albicy, 27 Rudy Gobert, 28 Petr Cornelie, 93 Moustapha Fall (Coach: Vincent Collet)

2022 EuroBasket: finished 2nd  among 24 teams

0 Élie Okobo, 2 Amath M'Baye, 3 Timothé Luwawu-Cabarrot, 4 Thomas Heurtel, 7 Guerschon Yabusele, 10 Evan Fournier (C),11 Théo Maledon, 17 Vincent Poirier, 21 Andrew Albicy, 22 Terry Tarpey, 27 Rudy Gobert, 93 Moustapha Fall (Coach: Vincent Collet)

Notable players and statistics

Historical key figures

Tariq Abdul-Wahad – former forward for the Sacramento Kings, Orlando Magic, Denver Nuggets, Dallas Mavericks
Alexis Ajinça – former center for the Charlotte Bobcats, Dallas Mavericks, Toronto Raptors, New Orleans Pelicans
Roger Antoine – FIBA European Selection (1964)
Nicolas Batum – guard-forward for the Portland Trail Blazers, Charlotte Hornets, Los Angeles Clippers
Rodrigue Beaubois – former guard for the Dallas Mavericks
Louis Bertorelle – French Basketball Hall of Fame (2008)
Éric Beugnot – 2× FIBA European Selection (1981 2×)
Jean-Paul Beugnot – FIBA's 50 Greatest Players (1991)
Jim Bilba – EuroLeague champion (1993), FIBA EuroStar (1999)
Yann Bonato – FIBA EuroStar (1996)
André Buffière – French Basketball Hall of Fame (2004)
Robert Busnel – French basketball star whom the French Basketball Cup is named after, in his honor
Jacques Cachemire – 3× FIBA European Selection (1974, 1975, 1979)
Richard Dacoury – EuroLeague champion (1993), 3× FIBA European Selection (1987 2×, 1991), FIBA EuroStar (1996)
René Chocat – French Basketball Hall of Fame (2012)
Nando de Colo – former guard for the San Antonio Spurs, Toronto Raptors
Jean Degros – FIBA European Selection (1966)
Boris Diaw – former forward-center for the Atlanta Hawks, Phoenix Suns, Charlotte Bobcats, San Antonio Spurs, Utah Jazz
Yakhouba Diawara – former guard-forward for the Denver Nuggets, Miami Heat
Maxime Dorigo – French Basketball Hall of Fame (2004)
Hervé Dubuisson – FIBA European Selection (1980)
Evan Fournier – guard-forward for the Denver Nuggets, Orlando Magic, Boston Celtics, New York Knicks
Jacques Flouret – French Basketball Hall of Fame (2010)
Mickaël Gelabale – former forward for the Seattle SuperSonics, Minnesota Timberwolves
Alain Gilles – FIBA's 50 Greatest Players (1991)
Rudy Gobert – center for the Utah Jazz, Minnesota Timberwolves
Joffrey Lauvergne – former forward-center for the Denver Nuggets, Oklahoma City Thunder, Chicago Bulls, San Antonio Spurs
Ian Mahinmi – former center for the San Antonio Spurs, Dallas Mavericks, Indiana Pacers, Washington Wizards
Jerome Moiso – former forward-center for the Boston Celtics, Charlotte Hornets, New Orleans Hornets, Toronto Raptors, New Jersey Nets, Cleveland Cavaliers
Robert Monclar – French Basketball Hall of Fame (2004)
Joakim Noah – former center for the Chicago Bulls, New York Knicks, Memphis Grizzlies, Los Angeles Clippers
Stéphane Ostrowski – 5× FIBA European Selection (1990, 1991 2×, 1995 2×)
Tony Parker – EuroBasket MVP (2013), EuroBasket All-Tournament Team (2003, 2011, 2013)
Jean Perniceni – French Basketball Hall of Fame (2009)
Jacques Perrier – French Basketball Hall of Fame (2006)
Johan Petro – former center for the Seattle SuperSonics / Oklahoma City Thunder, Denver Nuggets, New Jersey Nets, Atlanta Hawks
Mickaël Piétrus – former guard-forward for the Golden State Warriors, Orlando Magic, Phoenix Suns, Boston Celtics, Toronto Raptors
Antoine Rigaudeau – former guard for the Dallas Mavericks
Kevin Séraphin – former forward-center for the Washington Wizards, New York Knicks, Indiana Pacers
Jean-Pierre Staelens – FIBA European Selection (1973)
Philippe Szanyiel – FIBA European Selection (1991)
Axel Toupane – former guard for the Denver Nuggets, Milwaukee Bucks, New Orleans Pelicans
Ronny Turiaf – former forward-center for the Los Angeles Lakers, Golden State Warriors, New York Knicks, ASVEL Lyon-Villeurbanne, Washington Wizards, Miami Heat, Los Angeles Clippers, Minnesota Timberwolves
Frédéric Weis – 2000 Summer Olympics (silver medalist)

Players with the most games played
Players in bold are still active.

Players with the most points scored
Players in bold are still active.

Highest individual scoring games
Players in bold are still active.

Media coverage
France's matches are currently televised by France Télévisions.

Kit supplier

Manufacturer
2003–2013: Nike
2014–2017: Adidas
2017–present: Jordan Brand

Sponsor
2019–present: Amazon
2019–present: Suzuki

See also

Sport in France
France women's national basketball team
France men's national under-20 basketball team
France men's national under-19 basketball team
France men's national under-17 basketball team
France men's national 3x3 team

Notes

References

External links

 
France FIBA profile
France National Team – Men at Eurobasket.com
France Basketball Records at FIBA Archive

Videos
Huge Indoor Semi-Final Crowd of 26,922 in Amazing 360° : 4k EuroBasket 2015 Youtube.com video

Men's national basketball teams
 
 
1933 establishments in France
FIBA EuroBasket-winning countries